The mixed doubles of the 2002 Australian Open was held for the 58th time since the first tournament back in 1922. Heading into the tournament, Corina Morariu and Ellis Ferreira were the defending champions, but could not defend their title. While Morariu did not compete this year, Ferreira partnered with Cara Black and lost in the first Round to Rita Grande and Jeff Tarango in three sets.

Daniela Hantuchová and Kevin Ullyett won the title, defeating Paola Suárez and Gastón Etlis 6–3, 6–2 in the final. It was the second Grand Slam mixed doubles title for Hantuchová and the only title in mixed doubles for Ullyett, in their respective careers.

Seeds

Draw

Finals

Top half

Bottom half

External links
 Draws
 2002 Australian Open – Doubles draws and results at the International Tennis Federation

Mixed Doubles
Australian Open (tennis) by year – Mixed doubles